Vairumati tei Oa is an 1892 painting by Paul Gauguin, produced during his time in Polynesia. Its title translates as Her name was Vairaumati. It remained in the artist's family before passing to Ambroise Vollard's gallery in Paris. Sergei Schukin acquired it from the latter in 1904 and in 1918 it was acquired by the 1st Museum of New Western Painting. Since 1948 it has been in the Pushkin Museum in Moscow.

References

1892 paintings
Paintings by Paul Gauguin
Paintings in the collection of the Pushkin Museum